Kikon is a Lotha Naga surname. Notable people with the surname include:

 Dolly Kikon (born 1975), Indian anthropologist
 Mmhonlümo Kikon (born 1978), Indian politician
 Silas Kikon (1956–2016), Naga singer and composer

Surnames of Naga origin
Naga-language surnames